Repentigny is a federal electoral district in Quebec, Canada, that has been represented in the House of Commons of Canada since 1997. It consists of the Regional County Municipality of L'Assomption, except the city and parish of L'Épiphanie.

Demographics
According to the Canada 2001 Census

Ethnic groups: 98.7% White 
Languages: 97.3% French, 1.1% English, 1.3% Others 
Religions: 94.5% Catholic, 1.3% Protestant, 3.4% No religion
Average income: $30,277

According to the Canada 2016 Census
 Languages: (2016) 92.5% French, 1.5% Spanish, 1.5% English, 1.3% Creole, 1.0% Arabic, 0.5% Italian, 0.3% Portuguese, 0.2% Romanian, 0.1% Greek, 0.1% Khmer, 0.1% Mandarin, 0.1% Russian, 0.1% Vietnamese, 0.1% Turkish

Political geography
Repentigny had long been one of the most separatist ridings in Quebec. In the 2006 election, every single poll was won by the Bloc Québécois.  However, the riding was caught up in the New Democratic Party tsunami that swept through the province five years later.

History

It was created in 1996 from parts of Joliette and Terrebonne ridings. It consisted initially of  the cities of Charlemagne, Lachenaie, Mascouche and Repentigny; and the Parish Municipality of La Plaine in the County Regional Municipality of Les Moulins. This riding lost territory to Montcalm during the 2012 electoral redistribution.

Members of Parliament

Electoral history

2021 federal election

2019 federal election

2015 federal election

2011 federal election

2008 federal election

Fr. Gravel chose not to run again, citing pressure from the Church. Party activist Nicolas Dufour secured the Bloc nomination, becoming one of their youngest candidates. Réjean Bellemare ran again for the NDP. The Bloc held the riding handily, with the NDP securing one of the party's four second-place finishes in the province.

2006 by-election

MP Benoît Sauvageau was killed in a car accident on August 28, 2006.  Prime Minister Stephen Harper called for a by-election on October 22, 2006 with a polling day of November 27, 2006.

There had been a lot of pressure from opposition parties for Public Works Minister Michael Fortier, a Conservative senator, to run here; however, he has declined.  Fortier was appointed to the Senate and the Cabinet to represent Greater Montreal which elected no Conservatives in the last federal election, while Fortier pledged to resign from the Senate and seek election to the House of Commons in the next federal election. Instead, the Conservative candidate was Stéphane Bourgon, a lawyer.  The Bloc Québécois, of which Sauvageau was a member, ran Raymond Gravel, a Roman Catholic priest.  The New Democratic Party candidate was union activist and former Canadian Navy member Réjean Bellemare, who had also run for the NDP in the previous general election.

The Green Party of Canada had announced that Marc-André Gadoury would be their candidate, but he did not complete and submit paperwork to Elections Canada in sufficient time to get on the ballot. Gadoury suggested that the Greens did not submit the paperwork on purpose and on November 25, 2006, La Presse reported that Gadoury was endorsing the NDP candidate, Réjean Bellemare.

Raymond Gravel of the Bloc Québécois won the by-election with an approximately two-thirds majority of votes.

1997-2006

See also
 List of Canadian federal electoral districts
 Past Canadian electoral districts

References

Campaign expense data from Elections Canada
Riding history from the Library of Parliament
2011 Results from Elections Canada

Notes

Quebec federal electoral districts
Repentigny, Quebec